Rocky J. Adkins (born November 4, 1959) is an American politician from Kentucky. He is a member of the Democratic Party and is serving as a senior advisor to the Governor of Kentucky, Andy Beshear. He is a former member of the Kentucky House of Representatives, representing the 99th District of the Kentucky House from 1987 to 2019. His House district was in eastern Kentucky and included Elliott, Lewis, and Rowan Counties. From 2003 through 2016 he was the House majority leader. From 2016 to 2019, he was the chamber's Minority Floor Leader.

Adkins ran for governor of Kentucky in the 2019 Kentucky gubernatorial election, with running mate Stephanie Horne. During his campaign, he raised $1.5 million. Adkins finished in second place in the Democratic primary, losing to Kentucky Attorney General Andy Beshear. Adkins joined the Beshear administration on December 10, 2019, as the governor's senior advisor.

Education
Adkins attended Elliott County High School and Morehead State University (MSU). He played college basketball for the Morehead State Eagles in 1981 and 1982 as the starting point guard; in college he avereaged 2.2 points and 2.7 assists per game. Adkins earned his bachelor's and master's degrees at Morehead State University. In 2017, Morehead's new dining commons was dedicated to and named after Adkins. He was inducted into the MSU Alumni Hall of Fame in 2004, and named the recipient of the 2012 Founders Award for University Service.

Career

Kentucky legislature
Adkins was a member of the Commonwealth of Kentucky House of Representatives between 1987 and 2019. He has long been a strong supporter of education in Eastern Kentucky. He was a member of the House Democratic Leadership office.
Adkins ran unopposed in 11 out of his 12 re-elections to his seat in the Kentucky Legislature, the only contested election being in 2016 when he won by a margin of 32%.

Gubernatorial campaign

In November 2018, Adkins announced his candidacy for the 2019 Kentucky gubernatorial election. During his announcement, Adkins stated that Stephanie Horne, a seat on the Jefferson County Board of Education, would be his running mate. Paul E. Patton, who served as Kentucky governor from 1995 to 2003, endorsed Adkins. Adkins lost the Democratic primary on May 21, 2019, placing second to Attorney General Andy Beshear. Following his loss, Adkins endorsed Beshear in the general election.

Political positions 
Adkins supports "a fully-funded pension system" and the use of medicinal marijuana, which he believes could provide income to help fund public pensions. He also believes the state legislature needs to work with the federal government to try to expand Medicaid.

Adkins opposes increased regulation on gun ownership.

Philanthropy 
A cancer survivor himself, Adkins sponsors the annual "Rocky Adkins Charity Golf Outing – Cure for Cancer" which has raised over $2.3 million for cancer research since its beginning in 1995.

References

External links
Rocky for Kentucky -campaign website
Kentucky Legislature - Representative Rocky Adkins official government site
Project Vote Smart - Representative Rocky Adkins (KY) profile
Follow the Money - Rocky Adkins
2008 2006 2004 2002 2000 1998 1996 1994 campaign contributions
KentuckyVotes.org - Rep. Rocky Adkins bills introduced and voting record

1959 births
20th-century American politicians
21st-century American politicians
American men's basketball players
Living people
Democratic Party members of the Kentucky House of Representatives
Morehead State Eagles men's basketball players
People from Elliott County, Kentucky
People from Morehead, Kentucky